Vickram College of Engineering, is a professional college founded and managed by engineers. VICKRAMCE is approved by All India Council for Technical Education, New Delhi and is affiliated to Anna University, Chennai.

The college was established in the year 2001 with three branches of study, namely Computer Science, Electronics & Communication and Information Technology. In 2002, Electrical & Electronics was included. Later in 2004 Civil and Mechanical Engineering were added.

Campus

The college is located on Madurai Sivagangai Road, about 26 km from Madurai city limit and 19 km from Sivagangai city. The college campus spreads over 40 acres, on Madurai Sivagangai highway. The Educational area measures to 2,50,000 sq-ft. The college is 35 minutes drive from Madurai, the temple city of India.

Organisation and administration 
Srinivas Trust is a profit oriented organization, which runs four institutions namely, Vickram College of Engineering, Vickram Polytechnic college, Vickram School of Teacher Training and Vickram College of Teacher Education.

Academics

Academic programs
Vickram CE offers Under-Graduate Programs and Post-Graduate Programs under both Engineering and Science Streams.

Under Graduate Degree Programs

 B.E. - CIVIL Engineering

 B.E. - Computer science and engineering

 B.E. - MECHANICAL ENGINEERING

 B.E. - Electronics and Communication Engineering

 B.E. - Electricals and Electronics Engineering

 B.E. - Information Technology

Post Graduate Degree Programs

 M.E. - Computer Science and Engineering

Placements

This institute provide placement training to the students, like providing spoken English training, online exams and also personality development trainings .

Library
The college has a library. Besides the classroom lecture, the college gives equal importance to reference studies on the topics covered. The computerised library houses about 20,000 volumes of 12000 titles. The library is equipped with 12 computers for academic and browsing purposes.

Student life

Internet Facility
The college has a broadband Internet connection 8 Mbit/s (1:1) exclusively for the college. WiFi Campus. All computers are connected and have Internet access. Computers in Hostels are connected and have Internet access.

Hostels

The institutes offers residential facilities to the students managed by experienced wardens who ensure that the inmates feel at home.

Separate Men's and Women's Hostel are situated within the campus. There is a mess unit for each hostel. Students staying in the hostel have to necessarily take their food in the Hostel Mess. The mess attached to the hostels are managed with student's participation.

For the recreation of the inmates, each Hostel has Recreation room with television, library, Gymnasium and browsing facilities. Separate telephone connections are available for the respective hostels. The students can also avail themselves the facilities provided by the Physical Education and Sports department.

Hostels are provided with computers with WiFi Internet Access.

Dining Services
The institute also runs a canteen for the benefit of the students and faculties alike. It offers food, snacks and beverages like tea/ coffee and soft drinks.

Transport
only 36 km.but covered distance time is 2hours

Sports
The institute has separate playgrounds for cricket, football and volleyball. It has cricket nets for providing better practice. The ground has a separate area marked for other track and field games. Apart from the above indoor games like Table Tennis, Chess and Carrom are played by the students. The college is planning to set up Tennis, Squash and Badminton courts.

See also
Anna University

External links
https://web.archive.org/web/20110829041139/http://uenathi.org/techie/
http://www.vickramce.org/
https://web.archive.org/web/20100722010511/http://www.tau.edu.in/

References

https://www.annauniv.edu/cai/District%20wise/district/Madurai.php

All India Council for Technical Education
Engineering colleges in Tamil Nadu
Colleges affiliated to Anna University
Educational institutions established in 2001
2001 establishments in Tamil Nadu